Digi Communications, also known as RCS & RDS, is a Romanian telecommunications holding company operating in Romania, Hungary, Spain, Italy and now Portugal. Digi was founded by Zoltán Teszári, who is the majority shareholder, and has been listed on the Bucharest Stock Exchange since May 16, 2017.

In 2019, Digi had a market share of 51% in Romania and the vast majority of its subscribers are connected via fiber, a process which was started in 2006. This has had a major contribution to Romania's status as a country with one of the highest fixed broadband internet speeds in the world.

History

First cable networks 
In 1992 TVS Holding Brasov was developed by Zoltán Teszári, Ioan Bendei and other businessmen. The company offered cable television services in Brașov and Timișoara. In 1993 Zoltán Teszári co-founded Kappa cable company in Bucharest. In 1996, the shareholders decided to divide the Kappa network into two equal parts. Half owned by Zoltán Teszári merged with Analog CATV SA cable company in Bucharest. The other half was bought in 2000 by Astral Telecom, which in 2005 was merged with UPC Romania (now Vodafone Romania). This separation of the company led to the division of the areas in Bucharest between the two companies for 10 years. 

A cable network was built in Chișinău, Republic of Moldova in 1995, which was later sold.

Development 

In 1997 the company changed its name to Romania Cable Systems SA (RCS). Same year it is established Romania Data System SA (RDS) which offers internet services. Among the investors in the company from the beginning until the listing on the stock exchange were Carpathian Cable Investments S.a.R.L. from 1998 and Celest Limited from 1999. 

The company entered Hungary in November 1998 after buying 15 small and medium cable companies in Budapest and 3 other cities. Between December 1999 and January 2000, the first cable networks were acquired in Slovakia, where Slovakia Cable Systems (SCS) was 95% owned by RCS.

In April 2000, the project to build a 4,200 km national fiber optic network was initiated.

In 2003, after the liberalization of the market, the fixed telephony service was launched in Romania. Digi TV satellite television platform was first launched in Romania in December 2004, followed by launches in Hungary in February 2006, in the Czech Republic and Slovakia in August 2006 and in Croatia and Serbia in December 2006.

2005-2014 

RCS and RDS merged to form RCS & RDS on 26 April 2005. The company focused on rapid development both organically and through acquisitions. The C-Zone network was acquired in 2006, entering certain areas in Bucharest that were not covered due to zone exclusivity. In these areas RCS & RDS kept the brand until 2009.

Digi Slovakia, including the Digi Sport television channels in Slovakia and the Czech Republic, were sold to Slovak Telekom in 2013. Also, satellite television subsidiary in the Czech Republic was sold to Lama Energy in March 2015, which continued to use the Digi brand for other acquired internet and IPTV provider until 1 April 2020.
The subsidiary in Croatia was sold to A1 Telekom Austria's Vipnet (now A1 Croatia).

Mobile development 
In 2014, the mobile phone service was relaunched, followed by the launch of 4G service in 2015. 

Satellite television subsidiary in Serbia was sold to Kopernikus Technology, which in turn was sold to Telekom Srbija (mts) in 2018.

In 2017, Digi bought the Invitel cable company in Hungary. After initially receiving approval in May 2018, it was revoked in November 2018, due to finding non-competitive issues in certain areas. These have been resolved and the transaction was completed in March 2020.

Corporate structure 

RCS & RDS SA is the Romanian company founded in 1994 by Zoltán Teszári. It's incorporated in the Netherlands since 2000 when Cable Communications NV was established. It was renamed Digi Communications NV in 2017 when was listed.

Services

Broadband internet 

Digi implemented FTTB technology on almost the entire network in Romania and Hungary in 2006. Then followed the implementation of GPON in 2008, covering the houses as well. In 2013 started replacing FFTB with FTTH. In 2018 Digi started offering internet services through FTTH in Spain.

Mobile telephony 

The company launched Digi Mobil in Romania in December 2007 which offered mobile telephony limited to 3G service only at the time. In 2014, the mobile phone service was relaunched, followed by the launch of 4G service on band 38 in 2015 and on band 1 in 2018.

After winning a mobile operator license in 2014 and numerous delays, the company launched mobile services in Hungary in 2019.

In Spain, due to the number of Romanians, MVNO mobile telephony services were launched through Movistar in 2008. Initially, the company attracted Romanians because it offered cheap calls with Romanian networks. Vodafone Spain reacted after 1 year when it started losing customers by offering free calls with Vodafone Romania. This was followed by offers for Latin Americans.
Then the company started offering internet at a low price, attracting Spanish customers. Digi became the second MVNO operator by number of customers. 

Following the model in Spain, in 2010 Digi Mobil was launched as MVNO in Italy through TIM, but it was not as successful despite the fact that in Italy is a larger number of Romanians. Vodafone Italia began to offer free calls with Vodafone Romania and fixed networks before the launch of Digi Mobil.

Cable television 

The company offers all channels in one package except premium channels.

Television channels 

In July 2009, Digi launched the Digi Sport channels in Romania and Hungary. Then followed the Digi Sport channels in Slovakia and the Czech Republic in August 2010, which have been operated separately since 2013 following the takeover of Digi Slovakia by Slovak Telekom. 

In the summer of 2010, it acquired 50% of Music Channel, which launched Hit Music Channel in January 2012. The company launched a generalist channel in December 2010, but due to the low audience it was closed. The premium movie channel Digi Film (now Film Now) was launched on 1 February 2011. In 2011, Digi acquired the UTV TV music channel.

Digi24 TV news channel was launched on 1 March 2012. Following disagreements with Discovery, the company launched 3 thematic channels in October 2012: Digi World, Digi Life and Digi Animal World. On 10 December 2018, Digi 4K was launched.

Energy supplier  

In April 2015, Digi launched the energy supply service. The company had in 2017 the most subscribers on the competitive market from the companies that do not have the distribution infrastructure. In 2019, it increased tariffs by 30% due to a tax added by the government and then by 20%. The company announced that it is gradually giving up the supply service due to the unusual volatility of the electricity price.

Digi brand 

RCS & RDS introduced the Digi TV brand for satellite television services in December 2004 in Romania and in 2006 in Hungary, Slovakia, the Czech Republic, Croatia and Serbia. In 2006 the company unified under the Digi brand the cable television, internet and telephony services in Hungary, followed by Slovakia in June 2007. In Romania all the services rebranded Digi in 2009 but it is used together with the old RCS & RDS brand.

Mobile frequencies  
The following is a list of Digi Mobil mobile frequencies in Romania and Hungary.

Romania

Hungary

Shareholding 

The majority owner of Digi Communications NV is RCS Management SA, which includes politicians among shareholders.  In 2016 the shareholders of this company were:
 Zoltán Teszári – 59.23%
 Cable Communications Systems NV – 2.47%
 8 individual associates – 38.30%

Controversy  

In 2012, the operator removed Discovery channels from the grid, motivating that it would have requested too much money for retransmission. During public discussions, Digi offered to redistribute all Discovery channels in a separate package, but Discovery refused. Only Discovery and TLC returned to the grid in December 2016.

In 2012, Digi removed the Antena TV Group channels from the satellite television grid following disagreements. In 2013, the director of Digi, Ioan Bendei was blackmailed to sign the distribution contract by the director of Antena Group, otherwise he will denounce him for corruption of the television rights of the national football league.
The director of Antena Group was sentenced to prison for blackmail.
After evidence of corruption made public by a journalist in 2013, the directors of Digi and of the Professional Football League were convicted in January 2019. 
Digi and Antena Group have dropped the litigations in May 2018.

In Hungary, Digi was excluded from the auction for 5G licenses in 2019, motivating its decision on assumptions and facts that are supposed to happen. Digi filed an appeal that was not admitted, then sued NMHH, the regulator of the telecommunications market. Meanwhile, the 5G auction has been closed.

References

External links
 
 Digi Romania
 Digi Hungary
 Digi Spain
 Digi Italy

Companies based in Bucharest
Telecommunications companies of Romania
Telecommunications companies of Hungary
Telecommunications companies of Spain
Internet service providers of Romania
Internet service providers of Spain
Mobile phone companies of Romania
Mobile phone companies of Spain
Mobile phone companies of Italy
Cable television companies
Television networks in Romania
Romanian brands